A taskbar is an element of a graphical user interface which has various purposes. It typically shows which programs are currently running.

The specific design and layout of the taskbar varies between individual operating systems, but generally assumes the form of a strip located along one edge of the screen. On this strip are various icons which correspond to the windows open within a program. Clicking these icons allow the user to easily switch between programs or windows, with the currently active program or window usually appearing differently from the rest. In more recent versions of operating systems, users can also "pin" programs or files so that they can be accessed quickly, often with a single click. Due to its prominence on the screen, the taskbar usually also has a notification area, which uses interactive icons to display real-time information about the state of the computer system and some of the programs active on it.

With the rapid development of operating systems and graphical user interfaces in general, more OS-specific elements have become integrated into and become key elements of the taskbar.

Early implementations

Windows 1.0 
Windows 1.0, released in 1985, features a horizontal bar located at the bottom of the screen where running programs reside when minimized (referred to as "iconization" at the time), represented by icons. A window can be minimized by double-clicking its title bar, dragging it onto an empty spot on the bar, or by issuing a command from one of its menus. A minimized window is restored by double-clicking its icon or dragging the icon out of the bar.

The bar features multiple slots for icons and expands vertically to provide the user with more rows as more slots are needed. Its color is the same as that of the screen background, which can be customized. Minimized windows can be freely placed in any of the empty slots. Program windows cannot overlap the bar unless maximized.

The Start button did not make an appearance in these early implementations of the taskbar, and would be introduced at a much later date with the release of Windows 95.

Arthur 
Another early implementation can be seen in the Arthur operating system from Acorn Computers. It is called the icon bar and remains an essential part of Arthur's succeeding RISC OS operating system. The icon bar holds icons which represent mounted disc drives and RAM discs, running applications and system utilities. These icons have their own context-sensitive menus and support drag and drop behaviour.

Amiga 
AmigaOS featured various third party implementations of the taskbar concept, and this inheritance is present also in its successors. For example, AmiDock, born as third-party utility, has then been integrated into AmigaOS 3.9 and AmigaOS 4.0. The AROS operating system has its version of Amistart that is provided with the OS and free to be installed by users, while MorphOS has been equipped with a dock utility just like in AmigaOS or Mac OS X.

Microsoft Windows 
The default settings for the taskbar in Microsoft Windows place it at the bottom of the screen and includes from left to right the Start menu button, Quick Launch bar, taskbar buttons, and notification area. The Quick Launch toolbar was added with the Windows Desktop Update and is not enabled by default in Windows XP. Windows 7 removed the Quick Launch feature in favor of pinning applications to the taskbar itself. On Windows 8 and Windows Server 2012, a hotspot located in the bottom-left corner of the screen replaced the Start button, although this change was reverted in Windows 8.1 and Windows Server 2012 R2.

The taskbar was originally developed as a feature of Windows 95, but it was based on a similar user interface feature called the  that was developed as part of Microsoft's Cairo project.

With the release of Windows XP, Microsoft changed the behavior of the taskbar to take advantage of Fitts's law by removing a border of pixels surrounding the Start button which did not activate the menu, allowing the menu to be activated by clicking directly in the corner of the screen.

Taskbar elements 
 The Start button, a button that invokes the Start menu (or the Start screen in Windows 8.1). It appears in Windows 9x, Windows NT 4.0 and all its successors, except Windows 8 and Windows Server 2012.
 The Quick Launch bar, introduced on Windows 95 and Windows NT 4.0 through the Windows Desktop Update for Internet Explorer 4 and bundled with Windows 95 OSR 2.5 Windows 98, contains shortcuts to applications. Windows provides default entries, such as Launch Internet Explorer Browser, and the user or third-party software may add any further shortcuts that they choose. A single click on the application's icon in this area launches the application. This section may not always be present: for example it is turned off by default in Windows XP and Windows 7.
 The Windows shell places a taskbar button on the taskbar whenever an application creates an unowned window: that is, a window that does not have a parent and that is created according to normal Windows user interface guidelines. Typically all Single Document Interface applications have a single taskbar button for each open window, although modal windows may also appear there.
 Windows 98 and Windows Desktop Update for Windows 95 introduced the ability to minimize foreground windows by clicking their button on the taskbar. They also introduced DeskBands (band objects).
 Windows 2000 introduced balloon notifications.
 Windows Me added an option to disable moving or resizing the taskbar.
 Windows XP introduced taskbar grouping, which can group the taskbar buttons of several windows from the same application into a single button. This button pops up a menu listing all the grouped windows when clicked. This keeps the taskbar from being overcrowded when many windows are open at once.
 Windows Vista introduced window previews which show thumbnail views of the application in real-time. This capability is provided by the Desktop Window Manager. The Start menu tooltip no longer says "Click here to begin" but now says simply "Start".
 Windows 7 introduced jumplists which are menus that provide shortcuts to recently opened documents, frequently opened documents, folders paths (in case of Windows Explorer), or various options (called Tasks) which apply to that specific program or pinned website shortcut. Jump lists appear when the user right-clicks on an icon in the taskbar or drags the icon upwards with the mouse left click. Recent and frequent files and folders can be pinned inside the jump list.
 Windows 7 introduced the ability to pin applications to the taskbar so that buttons for launching them appear when they are not running. Previously, the Quick Launch was used to pin applications to the taskbar; however, running programs appeared as a separate button.
 Windows 7 removed several classic taskbar features.
 Windows 11 removed taskbar grouping, possibility to move taskbar to the other sides of the screen, etc., but old Taskbar still could be reactivated.
  are minimized functional, long-running programs, such as Windows Media Player. Programs that minimize to deskbands are not displayed in the taskbar.
 The  is the portion of the taskbar that displays icons for system and program features that have no presence on the desktop as well as the time and the volume icon. It contains mainly icons that show status information, though some programs, such as Winamp, use it for minimized windows. By default, this is located in the bottom-right of the primary monitor (or bottom-left on languages of Windows that use right-to-left reading order), or at the bottom of the taskbar if docked vertically. The clock appears here, and applications can put icons in the notification area to indicate the status of an operation or to notify the user about an event. For example, an application might put a printer icon in the status area to show that a print job is under way, or a display driver application may provide quick access to various screen resolutions. The notification area is commonly referred to as the system tray, which Microsoft states is wrong, although the term is sometimes used in Microsoft documentation, articles, software descriptions, and even applications from Microsoft such as Bing Desktop. Raymond Chen suggests the confusion originated with systray.exe, a small application that controlled some icons within the notification area in Windows 95. The notification area is also referred to as the status area by Microsoft.
 In older versions of Windows the notification area icons were limited to 16 colors. Windows Me added support for high color notification area icons.
 Starting with Windows XP, the user can choose to always show or hide some icons, or hide them if inactive for some time. A button allows the user to reveal all the icons.
 Starting with Windows Vista, the taskbar notification area is split into two areas: one reserved for system icons including clock, volume, network and power; the other for applications.
 Since the Windows 95 Desktop Update, the Quick Launch bar featured  as one of its default shortcuts which automatically minimizes all opened applications, redundant with the Winkey-D key combination. On Windows 7, a dedicated Show desktop button was placed to the right of the notification area and could not be removed. With the "Peek" option enabled, hovering over the button hides all opened windows to expose the desktop (leaving outlines of them on-screen). On Windows 10, the "Show desktop" widget changed yet again, being reduced to a narrow iconless strip at the far right of the taskbar.

Customization 
The Windows taskbar can be modified by users in several ways. The position of the taskbar can be changed to appear on any edge of the primary display (except in Windows 11, where the taskbar is permanently fixed at the bottom of the screen and cannot be moved to the top, left, or right side). Up to and including Windows Server 2008, the taskbar is constrained to single display, although third-party utilities such as UltraMon allow it to span multiple displays. When the taskbar is displayed vertically on versions of Windows prior to Windows Vista, the Start menu button will only display the text "Start" or translated equivalent if the taskbar is wide enough to show the full text. However, the edge of the taskbar (in any position) can be dragged to control its height (width for a vertical taskbar); this is especially useful for a vertical taskbar to show window titles next to the window icons.

Users can resize the height (or width when displayed vertically) of the taskbar up to half of the display area. To avoid inadvertent resizing or repositioning of the taskbar, Windows XP and later lock the taskbar by default. When unlocked, "grips" are displayed next to the movable elements which allow grabbing with the mouse to move and size. These grips slightly decrease amount of available space in the taskbar.

The taskbar as a whole can be hidden until the mouse pointer is moved to the display edge, or has keyboard focus. The Windows 7+ taskbar does not allow pinning any arbitrary folder to the taskbar, it gets pinned instead to the jumplist of a pinned Explorer shortcut, however third party utilities such as Winaero's Taskbar Pinner can be used to pin any type of shortcut to the Taskbar.

Desktop toolbars 
Other toolbars, known as "Deskbands", may be added to the taskbar. This feature, along with many other taskbar features is currently absent in Windows 11. Windows includes the following deskbands but does not display them by default (except the Quick Launch toolbar in certain versions and configurations).
 Address. Contains an address bar similar to that found in Internet Explorer. (not available in Windows XP SP3, due to legal restrictions).
 Windows Media Player. Optionally shown when the Windows Media Player is minimized.(Windows XP, Windows Vista)
 Links. Shortcuts to items located in the user's Links folder. Usually shortcuts to internet sites.
 Tablet PC Input Panel. Contains a button to show the Tablet PC input panel for ink text entry.
 Desktop. Contains shortcuts to items contained on the user's desktop. Since the taskbar is always shown, this provides easy access to desktop items without having to minimize applications.
 Quick Launch. Contains shortcuts to Internet Explorer, email applications and a link to display the desktop. Windows Vista adds a link to the Flip 3D feature.
 Language. Contains shortcuts to quickly change the desired language for the keyboard to follow.

In addition to deskbands, Windows supports "Application Desktop Toolbars" (also called "appbands") that supports creating additional toolbars that can dock to any side of the screen, and cannot be overlaid by other applications.

Users can add additional toolbars that display the contents of folders. The display for toolbars that represent folder items (such as Links, Desktop and Quick Launch) can be changed to show large icons and the text for each item. Prior to Windows Vista, the Desktop Toolbars could be dragged off the taskbar and float independently, or docked to a display edge. Windows Vista greatly limited, but did not eliminate the ability to have desktop toolbar not attached to the taskbar. Windows 7 has deprecated the use of Floating Deskbands altogether; they only appear pinned into the Taskbar.

 Upon opening the Taskbar properties on Windows 95 and Windows 98 whilst holding down the CTRL key, an extra tab for DeskBar Options is shown, but no part of it can be used. The DeskBar option was a feature that was never included within these versions of Windows.

macOS 
Classic Mac OS did not display a taskbar onscreen by default. Application switching prior to Mac OS 8.5 was done by clicking on an application's window or via a pull-down menu at the right end of the menu bar. Prior to version 8.5 the menu's title was the icon of the foreground application. Version 8.5 introduced the ability to optionally also display the application name and to "tear off" the menu by dragging the title with the mouse. The torn off menu was displayed as a palette. The palette window could be configured using AppleScript to appear much like a taskbar, with no title bar and fixed to one edge of the screen. No control panel was provided by Apple to access this functionality, but third-party developers quickly wrote applications that allowed users unfamiliar with AppleScript to customize their application palettes. Third party taskbars such as DragThing were a popular category of shareware on these systems.

The Dock, as featured in macOS and its predecessor NeXTSTEP, is also a kind of taskbar. The macOS Dock is application-oriented instead of window-oriented. Each running application is represented by one icon in the Dock regardless of how many windows it has on screen. A textual menu can be opened by right-clicking on the dock icon that gives access to an application's windows. Mac OS X 10.2 added the ability for an application to add items of its own to this menu. Minimized windows also appear in the dock, in the rightmost section, represented by a real-time graphical thumbnail of the window's contents. The trash can is also represented in the Dock, as a universal metaphor for deletion. For example, dragging selected text to the trash should remove the text from the document and create a clipping file in the trash.

The right side of macOS's Menu bar also typically contains several notification widgets and quick access functions, called Menu extras.

Unix-like operating systems

KDE Plasma 
In KDE Plasma 5, taskbar uses Widgets, called "Plasmoids", as elements in taskbar. In the update 5.20 (November 2020) they updated the taskbar to look more like Windows 10 by only displaying icons by default and grouping application windows together.

GNOME 
GNOME 2 used its own type of taskbar, known as panels (the program responsible for them is therefore called gnome-panel). By default, GNOME 2 usually contains two full-width panels at the top and bottom of the screen. The top panel usually contains navigation menus labeled Applications, Places, and System in that order. These menus hold links to common applications, areas of the file system, and system preferences and administration utilities, respectively.

The top panel usually contains a clock and notification area, while the bottom panel contains buttons for navigating between virtual desktops, the window list proper, and a button which minimizes all windows (similarly to Windows' Show desktop button). The contents of panels are handled by widgets called panel applets, which can consist of application shortcuts, search tools, or other tools. The contents of the panels can be moved, removed, or configured in other ways.

In GNOME 3, panels are replaced by GNOME Shell, which consists of a bar across the top of the screen with an Activities button on the left, a clock in the centre, and a notification area on the right. GNOME Shell does not contain a traditional taskbar; users can manage windows, virtual desktops, and launch applications from either a "Dash" on the side of the screen, or by searching from Activities Overview, which is displayed by clicking on the Activities button. GNOME 3.8 introduces Classic Mode, which re-implements certain aspects of GNOME 2's desktop as an alternate desktop environment that can be selected at the login screen.

Other Unix environments 
These desktop environments provide their own implementation of a taskbar:
 Cinnamon
 MATE
 LXDE
 Xfce
 Trinity Desktop (based on KDE3's Kicker)

Standalone window managers that provide an integrated taskbar include:
 Fluxbox
 FVWM95
 IceWM
 JWM
 qvwm
 WindowLab
 Window Maker

Programs that offer standalone taskbars for desktop environments or window managers without one include Avant Window Navigator, pypanel, fbpanel, perlpanel, tint2, and others.

References 

Graphical user interface elements
Application launchers
Windows 95
Windows components